Kallah Sakan (also Romanized as Kallah Sakān, Kalleh Sakan, and Kalleh Sakān; also known as Kalīsagān, Kalsakān, and Kelīsgān) is a village in Pir Sohrab Rural District, in the Central District of Chabahar County, Sistan and Baluchestan Province, Iran. At the 2006 census, its population was 615, in 108 families.

References 

Populated places in Chabahar County